Myshak Metro Ballpark is under construction in Spruce Grove, Alberta, Canada. The baseball park is the home of the Edmonton Prospects, a Western Canadian Baseball League team playing in the West Division. The park is scheduled to open in 2024 and will seat 3,470 people. The ballpark replaced RE/MAX Field as the home of the Prospects. The ballpark was initially known as Spruce Grove Metro Ballpark during planning and construction, and naming rights were awarded on February 18, 2022, to the Myshak Group, a crane and rigging company.

The ballpark is part of a privately financed development by the Metro Horizon Group and will feature a microbrewery, an outdoor amphitheatre, an 80-unit condominium building known as the DiMaggio as well a field house and an auditorium.

The stadium itself will include a 360-degree concourse that wraps around the stadium, 2,200 lower-bowl seats, as well as options for Founders Club seats and Skybox Suites seats.

References

External links
 

Baseball venues in Alberta